Nohana Airport  is an airstrip serving the village of Nohana/Kitane in Mohale's Hoek District, Lesotho.

See also

Transport in Lesotho
List of airports in Lesotho

References

External links
 Nohanas
 HERE Maps - Nohana
 OpenStreetMap - Nohanas
 OurAirports - Nohanas

Airports in Lesotho